Jordan Renzo (born February 11, 1993) is an American actor. He is known for his roles as Matteusz Andrzejewski in the BBC Three Doctor Who spin-off Class (2016) and Charlie Brandon in the Starz historical drama The Spanish Princess (2019–2020).

Early life
Renzo attended the Guildhall School of Music and Drama. In February 2014 during his final year, Renzo played the titular role of Henry V. Renzo also sings (tenor) and has practised stage combat.

Career
In 2015, Renzo starred in short drama Ella. The following year, he made his feature film debut in the World War II film Chosen and his television debut as Matteusz Andrzejewski in the BBC Three Doctor Who spin-off Class. Renzo said that playing a gay character was made "quite easy" with the help of his co-star Greg Austin, and that their relationship was no different than the other relationships in the show. Despite not being credited in the opening credits of the series, Renzo's character was advertised as a series regular by the BBC multiple times. In 2018, Renzo reprised his role as Matteusz in six audio plays by Big Finish.

It was announced in 2018 that Renzo would star as Charlie Brandon in the Starz historical drama miniseries The Spanish Princess, which premiered in 2019 followed by a part two in 2020. Also in 2019, Renzo guest starred in an episode of the Netflix fantasy series The Witcher. The following year, he appeared in an installment of the Apple TV+ anthology Little America and the Irish horror film Boys from County Hell.

Filmography

Film

Television

Audio

References

External links
 
 Jordan Renzo at Curtis Brown
 
 

Living people
1993 births
21st-century American male actors
Alumni of the Guildhall School of Music and Drama
American expatriate male actors in the United Kingdom